August "Auggie" Vidovich II (born February 20, 1981) is an American professional stock car racing driver.

Racing career
Vidovich was born in Lakeside, California. Vidovich has competed in the Elite Division Southwest Series for several years. He had a NASCAR Craftsman Truck Series start in 1998 and two starts in 1999. He won the Southwest Series championship in 2003, and finished second in 2000, 2001, and 2005. In 2005, Vidovich won the Toyota All-Star Challenge. At the end of that season, Vidovich tried out for Roush Racing's Truck Series team in the team's TV show on the Discovery Channel, Roush Racing: Driver X, but was not selected. However, in the spring of 2006, Roush did decide to hire Vidovich to run one Truck race in place of David Ragan. Midway through the 2006 season, he was signed to pilot the No. 4 GEICO Dodge Charger for the Biagi Brothers in the Busch Series, and recorded a best finish of 15th at the Milwaukee Mile. He raced in 21 of 35 events and finished 33rd in the standings. In 2007, Vidovich was to have remained with Biagi running full-time and the team switching from Dodge to Toyota, but the team shut down in January of that year due to lack of sponsorship after GEICO left for Phoenix Racing's No. 7 car of Mike Wallace. He raced in one NASCAR Camping World West Series race in 2008. In 2009, Vidovich qualified Carl Edwards' No. 60 car for Roush in the now-Nationwide Series in a number of the standalone races when Edwards was at whatever track the Cup Series was racing at that weekend. In 2010, Vidovich raced in four West races; he won the Irwindale Speedway race and finished fourth at Phoenix International Raceway. These were his last NASCAR starts.

Motorsports career results

NASCAR
(key) (Bold – Pole position awarded by qualifying time. Italics – Pole position earned by points standings or practice time. * – Most laps led.)

Nationwide Series

Craftsman Truck Series

K&N Pro Series West

References

External links
 

Living people
1981 births
Sportspeople from San Diego County, California
Racing drivers from California
NASCAR drivers
People from Lakeside, California
RFK Racing drivers